Agriculture in Somaliland is the second most important of the productive sectors of Somaliland after livestock, and also is one of the main economy pillars of the country. Some of the main crops cultivated in Somaliland are sorghum, maize, tomatoes, lettuce, banana, onions, peppers, Strawberries and cabbage.

Gebiley and Awdal regions are the main areas for rain-fed productions. Somaliland has ten agro-ecological zones, eight of them are arid or desert with significant limited agricultural production, while the total arable land is estimated around 350,000 hectares across the country and mostly is concentrated northwestern regions, such as Awdal, Gebiley and Maroodi Jeex.

See also

 Economy of Somaliland
 Livestock in Somaliland

References

Economy of Somaliland